Chrostkowo  is a village in Lipno County, Kuyavian-Pomeranian Voivodeship, in north-central Poland. It is the seat of the gmina (administrative district) called Gmina Chrostkowo.

References

Villages in Lipno County
Płock Governorate
Warsaw Voivodeship (1919–1939)
Pomeranian Voivodeship (1919–1939)